International Forum of Allergy & Rhinology is a monthly peer-reviewed medical journal covering the study of allergy and otorhinolaryngology. It was established in 2011 and is published by Wiley-Blackwell on behalf of the American Rhinologic Society and the American Academy of Otolaryngic Allergy. It is the official journal of both societies. The editor-in-chief is David W. Kennedy (University of Pennsylvania Health System). According to the Journal Citation Reports, the journal has a 2018 impact factor of 2.521, ranking it 9th out of 42 journals in the category "Otorhinolaryngology".

References

External links

Wiley-Blackwell academic journals
Immunology journals
Otorhinolaryngology journals
Publications established in 2011
Monthly journals
English-language journals
Academic journals associated with learned and professional societies of the United States